Socialist Alternative (SA; ; Sotsialisticheskaya alternativa, SA) is a Trotskyist political party in Russia. It is affiliated to International Socialist Alternative. The organization publishes a newspaper of the same name.

History
From the early 1990s to 2009, a single CWI section called Socialist Resistance, existed in the countries of the Commonwealth of Independent States. In 2005 a group of members left to form VPERED. In 2009 a further split occurred due to differing positions on the recent Russo-Georgian War, with about half the Russian membership supporting Russian military intervention in South Ossetia and therefore leaving the CWI in disagreement. Those who left continued to use the Socialist Resistance name in Russia, while the CWI members in the CIS reorganized into the new Russian section, simply known as Russian Section of the CWI, and Socialist Resistance of Kazakhstan. In 2015, a faction within the organization split off to form a new group called Marxistskaya Gruppa 21. The Russian section renamed itself Sotsialisticheskaya Alternativa and is a member of the old CWI majority now called ISA (International Socialist Alternative).

CA members organizes protests against the Russian invasion of Ukraine and stand for an internationalist, working-class alternative to capitalist conflict.

LGBT rights campaigning
ISA members have been at the forefront of LGBT rights campaigns in Russia. In 2002, member and gay rights activist Sergei Kozlovsky was sued by Tamara Dadianova for the 50,000 rubles in a court in Yaroslavl, after he had spoken of how she and her friends had verbally abused him over his sexuality and tried to force him out of a poetry venue.

Members have also participated in Moscow pride activities, arguing for radical campaigning to fight for LGBT rights. They organized a picket outside the Mayor of Moscow's office after the 2006 pride march was banned. They also attempted to take part in the 2007 event which was similarly banned, which was widely reported after the arrest of British activist Peter Tatchell and German parliamentarian Volker Beck.

References

External links
Socialist Alternative (Russian section of the ISA)
 International Socialist Alternative

Communist parties in Russia
Eurosceptic parties in Russia
Far-left politics in Russia
Russia
LGBT political advocacy groups in Russia
Political parties with year of establishment missing
Russian democracy movements
Trotskyist organizations in Russia
Political organizations based in Russia